Sissel is a 2002 album by Norwegian singer Sissel Kyrkjebø released in the US. This is also her first release made for the US market.

In the finale of the fifth episode (of Season 3) of American television political drama series The Newsroom, which aired in December 2014, Shenandoah from Sissel was used.

Track listing
 Sarah's Song (4:26)
 Can't Go Back (3:51)
 Keep Falling Down (5:05)
 Shenandoah (3:58)
 All Good Things (5:00)
 We Both Know (3:25)
 Carrier Of A Secret (4:07)
 Solitaire (3:32)
 Should It Matter (4:51)
 Lær meg å kjenne (3:36)
 Weightless (4:50)
 Molde Canticle (3:26)

References

External links 
www.sissel.net
www.discogs.com
www.rockipedia.no

Sissel Kyrkjebø albums
2002 albums